Kalagi is a settlement in Mubende District in Central Uganda.

Location
The road is an all-weather tarmac highway between Kampala and Mubende. The small village was a coffee growing area in the 1950s and 60s, and is dominated by the family of the late Yosiya Baale of the Nyange clan. He was succeeded by his third son, David Livingstone Seruwu, who died in 2017. The coordinates of Kalagi, Mubende are:0°31'01.0"N, 31°38'56.0"E (Latitude:0.516944; Longitude:31.648889).

See also
List of cities and towns in Uganda

References

Populated places in Uganda
Cities in the Great Rift Valley